Calfactant, also known as Infasurf, is an intratracheal suspension derived from the natural surfactant in calf lungs. It is used in premature infants with lung surfactant deficiency that causes infant respiratory distress syndrome (IRDS).

Mechanism of action
Lung surfactant is essential for effective ventilation as it modifies alveolar surface tension. IRDS is caused by a lung surfactant deficiency. Calfactant serves as a substitute for the natural surfactant.

References 

Surfactants